John R. Lewis may refer to:
John Lewis (1940–2020), United States Congressman
John Lewis (California politician) (born 1954), former California State Senator
John Randolph Lewis (1834-1900), soldier and administrator

See also
John Lewis (disambiguation)